UFC 37: High Impact was a mixed martial arts event held by the Ultimate Fighting Championship at the CenturyTel Center in Bossier City, Louisiana on May 10, 2002. The event was seen live on pay per view in the United States, and was later released on home video.

History
The card was headlined by a Middleweight Title Bout between Murilo Bustamante and Matt Lindland, and featured the first UFC appearances of Robbie Lawler and Ivan Salaverry.

The fight between Bustamante and Lindland has led to the contest being known as the infamous "double tap" fight. Bustamante had Lindland hooked cleanly in an armbar early in the fight, then released it after what seemed to be a tap, followed by a shout to stop the action by John McCarthy. Lindland claimed it wasn't a tap, which controversially led McCarthy to restart the fight. Many thought that this was a mistake by McCarthy to stop the fight considering it was probably the only way for Lindland to escape the armbar.

Bustamante was stripped of the title in October 2002 after signing with PRIDE, thereby vacating the UFC Middleweight Championship belt.

Results

See also
 Ultimate Fighting Championship
 List of UFC champions
 List of UFC events
 2002 in UFC

External links
 Official UFC website
 Sherdog.com

Ultimate Fighting Championship events
2002 in mixed martial arts
Mixed martial arts in Louisiana
Sports in Shreveport, Louisiana
2002 in sports in Louisiana